In enzymology, a dolichyl-phosphate beta-D-mannosyltransferase is an enzyme that catalyzes the chemical reaction

GDP-mannose + dolichyl phosphate  GDP + dolichyl D-mannosyl phosphate

Thus, the two substrates of this enzyme are GDP-mannose and dolichyl phosphate, whereas its two products are GDP and dolichyl D-mannosyl phosphate.

This enzyme belongs to the family of glycosyltransferases, specifically the hexosyltransferases.  The systematic name of this enzyme class is GDP-mannose:dolichyl-phosphate beta-D-mannosyltransferase. Other names in common use include GDP-Man:DolP mannosyltransferase, dolichyl mannosyl phosphate synthase, dolichyl-phospho-mannose synthase, GDP-mannose:dolichyl-phosphate mannosyltransferase, guanosine diphosphomannose-dolichol phosphate mannosyltransferase, dolichol phosphate mannose synthase, dolichyl phosphate mannosyltransferase, dolichyl-phosphate mannose synthase, GDP-mannose-dolichol phosphate mannosyltransferase, GDP-mannose-dolichylmonophosphate mannosyltransferase, mannosylphosphodolichol synthase, and mannosylphosphoryldolichol synthase.  This enzyme participates in n-glycan biosynthesis.

References

 
 
 
 
 

EC 2.4.1
Enzymes of unknown structure